Daniel Gómez Rinaldi: (born November 19, 1965 in San Martín, Buenos Aires) is an Argentine journalist who has worked as actor sometimes.

Professional career

Early years

He studied journalism at the Instituto Grafotécnico o Escuela Superior de Periodismo and in the 80s began to work on radio before to work on graphic journalism.

After, he worked between 1989 and 1995 at the English newspaper  The Buenos Aires Herald, and different magazines like Semanario, Libre, Tal Cuál and La Revista.

In 1996 he created the magazine Buenos Aires Fashion News and worked for Chicas y Modelos.

TV works

In 1997 he began his artistic career on TV when worked with Lucho Avilés at the mid-afternoon show Indiscreciones where he worked until 1999.

Between 2000 and 2002 participated in Telepasillo and in 2002 was the presenter of Siempre Listos.

Finally, he began to work in Intrusos en el Espectáculo in 2003 with Jorge Rial. Now, he is working in the programme. Also, he worked in others shows like Intocables (2004), Detrás de Escena (2005) and Gran Hermano 2007: El Debate (2007).

He worked for the radio shows La Tapa in 2004 and Llamas con todo in 2006.

He was a contestant in Bailando por un Sueño 2011, and was paired with professional dancer Ana Laura López. He was replaced during the 6th and 7h round, due to an injury. He re-entered the competition in the 8th round, but was eliminated in a double elimination.

External links
  Daniel Gómez Rinaldi's Biography.

1965 births
Living people
People from San Martín, Buenos Aires
Argentine journalists
Male journalists
Argentine male actors
Argentine people of Spanish descent
Argentine people of Italian descent
Bailando por un Sueño (Argentine TV series) participants